This article lists songs about Oslo, set there, or named after a location or feature of the city.

It is not intended to include songs where Oslo is simply "name-checked" along with various other cities.
 This is a dynamic list of songs and may never be able to satisfy particular standards for completeness. You can help by expanding it with reliably sourced entries.

List

Oslo
Oslo
Oslo
Music in Oslo